Yorktown Historic District may refer to the following places:
Yorktown Historic District (Tulsa, Oklahoma), listed on the National Register of Historic Places
Yorktown Historic District (Philadelphia), listed on the National Register of Historic Places